Leonie Sandercock (born 1949) is an urban planner and academic focusing on community planning and multiculturalism. Her work spans the interdisciplinary fields of urban studies, urban policy and planning and elucidates issues of difference, social justice and possibility. She has been teaching at the School of Community & Regional Planning at University of British Columbia, Vancouver, Canada, since 2001.

Education and career
Sandercock received an MFA (screenwriting) from University of California at Los Angeles (1989), a PhD, Australian National University (1974) and a BA (Hons), University of Adelaide (1970). She has served as a senior academic in Australia at Macquarie University, RMIT University and the University of Melbourne, as well as UCLA. Sandercock is married to John Friedmann.

Leonie was professor and head of graduate Urban Studies at Macquarie University in Sydney from 1981- 1986 before moving to Los Angeles, where she had two careers, one in screenwriting, the other teaching in the Graduate School of Architecture and Urban Planning at UCLA. After moving to Canada and working on a documentary with two First Nations in north central British Columbia, Leonie's interest has shifted to Indigenous/non-Indigenous relations in Canada and other settler societies.

Her research now focuses on working with First Nations through collaborative community planning, using the medium of film as a catalyst for dialogue on the possibilities of healing, reconciliation, and partnership. She recently completed a documentary (with Giovanni Attili) entitled "Finding Our Way." Her current project, in collaboration with the Council of the Haida Nation and the Nunavut Independent TV Network, is developing a feature film script about the Haida, in Haida language, through a community story harvesting process.

Other research interests include immigration, cultural diversity and integration; a more therapeutic model of planning; the importance of stories and storytelling in planning theory and practice; and the role of multimedia in planning.

Since 2010 Leonie has been working on a new curriculum, Indigenous Community Planning, within the master's degree in Planning at the School of Community & Regional Planning at UBC. This curriculum has been designed and is now being delivered in partnership with the Musqueam First Nation, on whose traditional, ancestral, and unceded territory UBC is located. In 2014 there are 12 students enrolled in the ICP program (see www.scarp.ubc.ca/indigenous-community-planning).

Publications
Sandercock has published many books, the most influential of which is Towards Cosmopolis: Planning for Multicultural Cities (1997), and its sequel Cosmopolis 2: Mongrel Cities of the 21st Century which won the  Paul Davidoff Award from the American Collegiate Schools of Planning in 2005. These books established Sandercock as one of the foremost urban planning theorists concerning issues of multiculturalism in contemporary cities, and she is widely in demand internationally as a speaker.

Awards
In 2005 Sandercock was awarded the Dale Prize for Excellence in Urban and Regional Planning (community engagement), and in 2007 she received the BMW Group Award for Intercultural Learning for her writing on Cosmopolitan Urbanism and for her collaboration with Collingwood Neighbourhood House in Vancouver. Her film (with Giovanni Attili), Where Strangers Become Neighbours (National Film Board of Canada, 2007) has also won several awards.

She has also written books about sport (Australian football), and about the Australian labour movement, and had one of her screenplays (Captive) produced as an ABC TV Movie of the Week in 1992. Her most recent book (with Giovanni Attili, her research partner since 2005), is the edited collection, "Multimedia Explorations in Urban Policy and Planning: beyond the flatlands" (2010).

In September 2012 Sandercock was awarded an Honorary Doctorate for her lifetime contribution to planning scholarship by Roskilde University, Denmark.

Selected publications
Sandercock, L and Attili, G (2014) 'Changing the Lens: Film as Action Research and Therapeutic Planning Practice', Journal of Planning Education and Research.
 Sandercock, L and Attili, G (2010) Multimedia Explorations in Urban Policy and Planning, Springer 
 Attili, G and Sandercock, L (2010) Finding Our Way, 90 minute documentary, Vancouver: Moving Images. 
 Sandercock, L and Attili, G (2009) Where Strangers Become Neighbours: integrating immigrants in Vancouver, Canada, Springer, 
 Attili, G and Sandercock, L (2007) Where Strangers Become Neighbours, 50 minute documentary, Montreal: National Film Board of Canada 
 Sandercock, L (2003) Cosmopolis II: Mongrel Cities in the 21st Century, London: Continuum ( and 0826464637 (pbk.)) 
 Sandercock, L (1998) Towards Cosmopolis: planning for multicultural cities, London: John Wiley ( and 0471971987 (pbk)) 
 Sandercock, L (Ed)(1998) Making the invisible visible : a multicultural planning history, Berkeley : University of California Press ( (alk. paper) 052020735 (pbk)) 
 Sandercock, L (1990) Property, Politics, and Urban Planning: a history of Australian city planning, 1890-1990, Brunswick, New Jersey: Transaction Press. 
 Sandercock, L (1979) The Land Racket, Canberra: Silverfish. 
 Sandercock, L (1975) Cities for sale : property, politics and urban planning in Australia, Carlton, Vic. : Melbourne University Press

References

External links 
 Leonie Sandercock's webpage at UBC

1949 births
Academic staff of Macquarie University
Academic staff of the University of British Columbia
Living people
Urban theorists